The Afai is a river of south-eastern central Papua New Guinea. Namudi Airport lies along the river.

References

Rivers of Papua New Guinea
Oro Province